Janet Brown (27 January 1944 – 10 April 1995) was an English nurse who was murdered by an intruder in her house in Radnage, Buckinghamshire in 1995. The case remains unsolved, and the investigation remains open. Links have also been suggested between her murder and that of 50-year-old Carolanne Jackson 10 miles away in Wooburn Green, which occurred in similar circumstances and on almost the exact same day two years later. In 2015 it was announced by police that a DNA profile of Brown's killer had been extracted.

Biography
Janet Brown was born in Southampton, an only child. She worked as a research nurse at the Public Health and Primary Care department of Oxford University. Her husband, Grahaem Brown, worked in Switzerland as a senior executive at Ciba-Geigy, a pharmaceuticals company. The couple had three children. The family lived in a remote farmhouse, situated on an  estate in Radnage, Buckinghamshire, valued at £345,000 (1995 prices).

Following a spate of local burglaries, Janet Brown had formed the local Neighbourhood Watch scheme. She was known to be security-conscious, and had installed a panic alarm in the house.

Murder
Janet Brown was at home alone on the evening of the 10 April 1995. Her husband was working in Switzerland, her eldest daughter and son were at university and her youngest daughter was staying at the home of a friend. At some point after 2020 GMT, an intruder or intruders entered the house and handcuffed and gagged Brown, and then beat her across the head with a blunt instrument, possibly a crowbar, until dead. Police described the attack as "extremely brutal".

At some point Brown is believed to have triggered a panic button in her bedroom. Despite the alarm ringing, the killer seemed to have taken his time at the scene, washing his hands of blood and moving around the house.

Her body was discovered by builder Nick Marshall and his teenage son, who were performing renovation work on the garage, at the bottom of her stairs at 0811 GMT on the 11 April.

Initial investigation
There was no evidence of sexual assault, and police stated that they remain open-minded regarding the motive.

A prominent theory was that the murder was a result of a bungled burglary. The intruder had used glass-cutting equipment on the first panel of the doubled glazed patio door, and then simply smashed the second panel. However, although a television and video recorder were unplugged, nothing had been stolen from the house. Most burglaries take place during the day, when there is less likely to be anyone at home. It is unusual for burglars to target properties where someone is obviously inside, and there were two cars parked outside the house. Detective Superintendent Martin Short, who led the investigation, said, "on balance, I don't think the motive was burglary. If a burglar did it, it wasn't a half-decent one."

Police were unable to discover any evidence of an extramarital affair, and considered the scenario as unlikely. Other theories, such as industrial espionage, a failed kidnapping or a contract killing were examined and dismissed.

Police stated their belief that, due to the isolated location of the murder, the perpetrator was most likely a local man who was familiar with the area.

Paul Britton, a forensic psychologist, assisted police with their investigation. Britton posited that although Janet Brown had not been sexually assaulted, the perpetrator may have become aroused by inflicting fear, and dominating his victim, and that this, rather than burglary, may have been his primary motive.

Author Vanessa Brown wrote, "thieves don't take handcuffs to a robbery and strip their victims ... The one focus had been Janet, a desire to humiliate and control her. It had to be personal."

Detective Superintendent Martin Short commented:

There is no theory to explain what happened that night which makes perfect sense. There are aspects of every theory which are contradicted by the facts. And policemen deal in facts. The intruder showed a fair amount of planning. He had an iron bar or truncheon, two types of tape, handcuffs, a glass cutter and probably a torch. I have the gut feeling that it wasn't burglary. He didn't react like a normal burglar. More than 99 percent of burglars would run on hearing an alarm go off. This one not only continued his murderous attack but coolly washed his hands and went upstairs again. We don't know the motive. In most murders, once you've got the motive, then you're a long way to cracking it. There are no indications that Mrs Brown had a boyfriend. Everything points to the fact that she was a respectable woman who doted on her family. Her husband was definitely in Switzerland when she was killed and he had nothing to gain by her death.

By the second anniversary of the murder, 2,700 people had been interviewed by the police.

Possible links to Carolanne Jackson murder

On 11 April 1997, there was a similar murder of a 50-year-old woman 10 miles away in Wooburn Green, and police announced that they were investigating possible links between the cases. The victim was a jewellery dealer named Carolanne Jackson (also known as Carolyne Ann Jackson or Carol Anne Jackson), who ran an antiques business from her home. She had complained at least twice to police about a stalker before she was found dead and tied up in the kitchen of her cottage. She died from asphyxiation and from head injuries, and police thought that she had been beaten to death by a burglar who had tried to get her to give him details of how to get into her safe, where a large amount of jewels were stored. They also revealed that the killer may have waited for Jackson to return from a trip abroad, and followed her into her home as she was unloading her car. Jackson had lived alone, and she was also known to be very security-conscious and had her home protected by an alarm system. A few months before her death she had contacted police complaining of a man following her in her car, and had also reported a man standing outside her house, who then banged on the door. She had also made other previous complaints about being followed, and had been burgled the previous year. The lead detective on the case stated "It is my firm suspicion that regrettably Ms Jackson had been targeted by someone who knew what sort of trade she was in. Someone suspected she might have items at her home which would be of value. It is likely they had been hanging around the area waiting for her and, indeed, may have been in the area in earlier days or weeks." Some suggested that, had Jackson been stalked, her murder could have been sexually motivated.

One thing that was noted was the fact that the murders of Brown and Jackson, who were almost the exact same age, occurred on almost the exact same day two years apart - in Brown's case 10 April, in Jackson's 11 April.

The murderer had tied Jackson's hands and feet and took a Rolex watch from her body, as well as other jewellery. One of the items taken from her wrist was a gold 1930s Cartier bracelet, which has never been recovered. Her gold Rolex watch was worth £2,000 and had been worn by her every day for 20 years. The police were unable to open the house safe to see if the attacker had taken anything from it. The cottage had been ransacked and the contents of the cupboards and drawers were thrown over the floor. The severe wounds on her head had been caused by her being hit by fists and a blunt instrument. The items used to tie her hands and feet had come from her own home.

A witness came forward to say that they had seen a man acting suspiciously in the woods near her home on the night of her murder. The day after this sighting was reported in the press, police found a bag of clothes in the wood, containing some light casual clothes, towels and a 'sports gear' torch. They were inside a green "Welly Bag" made by Caboodle. Detectives stated that they did not know if the items were connected to the murder. On the same day the discovery of the clothes bag was reported, it was revealed that police were examining a possible link between Jackson's murder and a robbery at a Wargrave antiques store. The robbery took place in February of that year, and an elderly couple were tied up by the thieves. There had been other incidents in the Buckinghamshire region in recent weeks where wealthy people had been attacked and robbed in their homes by gangs. Detectives also examined possible links to a string of around 100 violent robberies nationwide, some of which were attributed to the work of a gang of robbers known as the "Quality Street Gang".

In 1998 Jackson and Brown's murders were suggested to be linked by Operation Enigma, a nationwide investigation into the unsolved murders of 207 women. 

An inquest into Jackson's death in 1999 concluded that she was almost certainly killed by an opportunist thief who followed her home after she withdrew £500 from a cashpoint. She had gone to the cashpoint at 9:30 p.m. before driving home, where she was attacked as she unloaded items from her car. Detectives also revealed at this point that they wanted to trace two men who had been seen leaving the area in a dark car that evening.

Developments since 2015
In 2015 police announced that they had isolated a DNA sample from the crime scene of the Brown murder. Almost every male from the surrounding area, over 700 people, were tested, with no match found.

Police later said they were concentrating on the bungled burglary theory. The chief investigating officer in 2015, Peter Beirne, stated, "my working hypothesis at the moment is that it was a burglar, or burglars, who weren't particularly proficient. They came across Janet, they had control of her because they handcuffed her, and I think she was bludgeoned to death when she pressed the panic alarm."

See also
List of unsolved murders in the United Kingdom
Murders of Kate Bushell and Lyn Bryant – two other UK unsolved murders which police believe may be linked

Other UK cold cases where the offender's DNA is known:
Murder of Deborah Linsley
Murders of Eve Stratford and Lynne Weedon
Murders of Jacqueline Ansell-Lamb and Barbara Mayo
Murder of Lindsay Rimer
Murder of Linda Cook 
Murder of Melanie Hall
Batman rapist, subject to Britain's longest-running serial rape investigation

Further reading

References

1944 births
1995 deaths
Crime in Buckinghamshire
Deaths by person in England
English nurses
Female murder victims
1995 murders in the United Kingdom
People from the Isle of Wight
Unsolved murders in England
People from Southampton